Magento is an open-source e-commerce platform written in PHP. It uses multiple other PHP frameworks such as Laminas (formerly known as Zend Framework) and Symfony. Magento source code is distributed under Open Software License (OSL) v3.0.  Magento was acquired by Adobe Inc in May 2018 for $1.68 billion.

The software was originally developed by Varien Inc., a US private company headquartered in Culver City, California, with assistance from volunteers and open-source software contributors.

More than 150,000  online stores have been created on the platform. The platform code has been downloaded more than 2.5 million times, and $155 billion worth of goods were sold through Magento-based systems in 2019. As of April 2021, Magento holds a 2.32% market share in global e-commerce platforms.

Varien published the first general-availability release of the software on March 31, 2008. Roy Rubin, the former CEO of Varien, later sold a share of the company to eBay, which eventually completely acquired and then sold the company to Permira; Permira later sold it to Adobe.

On November 17, 2015, Magento 2.0 was released. Among the features changed in V2 were:

 significant performance and security improvements, especially when paired with PHP version 7+
 integrated server-side Apache Varnish caching with minimal tuning
 reduced database table-locking issues
 enterprise-grade database scalability
 rich snippets for structured data
 new file structure with easier customisation
 CSS pre-processing using LESS & CSS URL resolver
 modular code base structure, offering fine-grain customisation
 improved coding patterns
 built-in client-side JavaScript minimisation and optimisation
 improved static content browser caching

Magento employs the MySQL or MariaDB relational database management system, the PHP programming language, and elements of the Zend Framework. It applies the conventions of object-oriented programming and model–view–controller architecture. Magento also uses the entity–attribute–value model to store data and as of version 2.4 it requires Elasticsearch for its catalog search capability. On top of that, Magento 2 introduced the Model-View-ViewModel pattern to its front-end code using the JavaScript library Knockout.js.

History

Magento officially started development in early 2007. Seven months later, on August 31, 2007, the first public beta version was released.

Varien, the company owning Magento, formerly worked with osCommerce. Varien had originally planned to fork osCommerce but later decided to rewrite it as Magento.

In the first years of its existence, the platform has been the winner of the "Best of Open Source Software Awards" and "SourceForge Community Choice Awards" several times.

In February 2011, eBay announced it had made an investment in Magento in 2010, worth a 49% ownership share of the company.
On June 6, 2011, eBay announced that it would be acquiring the rest of Magento, which would join its new X.Commerce initiative. Magento's CEO and co-founder Roy Rubin wrote on the Magento blog that "Magento will continue to operate out of Los Angeles, with Yoav Kutner and me as its leaders.".

Yoav Kutner left Magento in April 2012, citing that the vision for Magento had changed since the time of acquisition due to high-level staff changes.

As a result of the breakup of eBay following Carl Icahn's raid, Magento was spun out as an independent company by the new owner Permira private equity fund on 3 November 2015.

In May 2018 it was announced that Magento would be acquired by Adobe for $1.68bn with a view to integrating it into Adobe Experience Cloud, its Enterprise CMS platform. The acquisition was finalised on June 19, 2018.

Overview
Magento provides two distinct platforms: Magento Open Source (previously Magento Community Edition) and Magento Commerce; the latter is available in an on-premises version (previously Magento Enterprise Edition) or as a platform-as-a-service (previously Magento Enterprise Cloud Edition). There were also two former platforms, Magento Professional Edition, and Magento Go.

Magento Open Source
Magento Open Source, previously Magento Community Edition, is an open-source eCommerce platform. Developers can implement the core files and extend its functionality by adding new plug-in modules provided by other developers. Since the first public beta version was released in 2007, Magento Open Source has been developed and customized in order to provide a basic eCommerce platform.

The current release and each of the previous historical release versions of the 1.X and 2.X version branches of Magento Open Source are available on the Magento Commerce, Inc. website for download as single-file downloads. Development of the 2.X version branch of Magento Open Source is coordinated publicly on GitHub. Magento 1.9.4, the last version of Magento 1.X to be released, reached end-of-life on June 30, 2020.

The latest actively supported versions of Magento Open Source are 2.3.7-p1, 2.4.2-p2, 2.4.3 and 2.4.4 

Magento will remain Open source after the recent acquisition by Adobe.

OpenMage Initiative 

A fork of the last ever release of Magento 1.x (version 1.9.4.5) was made available on GitHub under an initiative named OpenMage which is short for Opensource Magento. Shortly afterwards a new unofficial community-driven project was created to offer long-term support and patches to Magento 1.x users.

Magento 2 
Magento 2 has many new and improved features, developer tools, and its architecture is quite different from all the previous versions. Magento 2 was announced in 2010. It was planned for release in 2011, and its merchant beta version was released in July 2015. Since then Magento 1 and Magento 2 have existed simultaneously.

Magento caters to three levels of businesses; small business, mid-market, and enterprise.

Magento Commerce / Adobe Commerce 
Released April 11, 2016, Magento Commerce is an e-Commerce platform as a service.

As part of a long-term project to integrate the acquired Magento sales, marketing, and product teams within the Adobe Experience Cloud business unit, in April 2021 Magento Commerce was rebranded to Adobe Commerce.

Magento Commerce (On-Premises) 
Magento Commerce (On-Premises), previously "Magento Enterprise Edition" is derived from Magento Open Source and has the same core files. Unlike Open Source, this is not free but has more features and functionality. This product is designed for large businesses that require technical support with installation, usage, configuration, and troubleshooting. Although Magento Commerce has annual maintenance fees, neither Open Source nor Commerce (On-Premises) include hosting. The Magento team develops Magento Commerce by cooperating with users and third parties. Development on the 2.X branch of Magento Commerce is coordinated publicly on GitHub.

The latest actively supported versions of Magento Commerce is 2.3.4 (EE and CE) released on October 8, 2019.

Magento Partners

Solution Partners 
Magento Solution Partners are development agencies who specialise in eCommerce delivery for Magento Commerce merchants and have extensive experience implementing, maintaining and upgrading Magento eCommerce websites. Many Magento solution partners develop their own extensions, solutions and customisation into the Magento Commerce platform.

Technology Partners 
Magento Technology Partners are companies or products that help merchants improve their website out of the box. They cover more than 20 different categories including marketing automation, payments, content management, shipping, tax, hosting, and performance. To ensure quality and compatibility, all Magento Technology Partners pass a rigorous business and technology review. Magento Technology Partners can be found in the official website directory.

Security concerns
In 2015 it was reported that outdated or unpatched Magento web stores were susceptible to a cross-site scripting attack, which allowed attackers to perform online skimming to steal user credit card information. According to a security expert, more than 4000 Magento web stores were vulnerable to such an attack in October 2016.

In 2017 security company DefenseCode reported that Magento CE web stores were susceptible to a remote code execution attack, which allowed attackers to perform web skimming, steal stored credit card information of future and previous customers, take control of the database, and in some instances even the complete server - including other Magento instances. It's suspected that up to 260,000 Magento web stores could be vulnerable to such an attack in April 2017.

In 2019, Magento reported a potential vulnerability in its administration URL location for its 2.1.x, 2.2.x, and 2.3.x versions. It also reported a critical security breach for customers running version 1.0.2 (and earlier versions) of the Magestore Store Locator extension. Similar incidences of a Magecart attack and Magento killer have also been faced by e-commerce store owners.

Events
"Imagine eCommerce" is the annual Magento eCommerce conference that has run since 2011. The first event was held in February 2011 in Los Angeles with more than 600 Magento merchants, partners, and developers. The goals of the event is sharing e-commerce ideas and providing networking opportunity sessions.

Besides Imagine, Magento also organizes local "Magento Live" events in which the participants will have opportunities to learn more about e-commerce in general, get introduced to local Magento partners and learn about upcoming changes to the Magento software itself. Magento Live events have been held in Australia (Sydney), UK (London), The Netherlands (Amsterdam), Spain (Barcelona), France (Paris) and Germany (München).

There is a non-profit organization that was established in 2019 and that contributes upto more than 24 global "Meet Magento" events per year named "Magento Association" The association is open to all companies who are active in ecommerce in any way and want using Magento commerce now or in future. The project has been run on all developed markets of Magento like Germany, Austria, Switzerland, France, Sweden, Denmark, Italy, Spain, the Netherlands, Poland, Romania, Russia, India and also Vietnam.

Certification
There are four different Magento certifications: three of them aim to prove developers' competency in implementing modules; one (Certified Solution Specialist) targets business users (consultants, analysts, project managers). Magento Front End Developer Certification is mainly focused on improving the user interface (UI) of back-end developers who implement the core modules. The Plus certification tests a deep understanding of Magento Enterprise modules and the entire architecture.

Resources 
Magento DevBox is a Docker container that allows for the easy installation of the latest Magento 2 CE or EE platform in a virtual environment.  It also allows developers to link to an existing local Magento 2 installation. As of June 2017, it is still in beta.

Magento Commerce 2.3.4 released on January 28, 2020, the latest version is v2.3.4, download it from tech resources page or GitHub.

Magento 1 migration to Magento 2 can be done by the official Data Migration Tool. The migration can be performed by developers with extensive Magento 1 and 2 experience.

Magento also has a diverse group of eCommerce articles written to help B2B and B2C companies. These can be found in the blog section of the website.

eCommerce case studies are also another portion of the Magento website that provides inside information on how Magento impacts brands.

Criticism and controversy 
A TechCrunch article reports that according to its sources, former Magento employees claim they have been collectively "cheated out" of nearly 7-10% of Magento, a stake that would have been worth approximately $18 million when eBay acquired the company.

See also

 Comparison of shopping cart software
 List of online payment service providers

References 

EBay
Free e-commerce software
Companies based in Culver City, California
Software companies based in California
Free software programmed in PHP
Software using the Academic Free License
Free content management systems
Software using the Open Software License
Defunct software companies of the United States
2010 mergers and acquisitions